Meuse TGV is a railway station that opened in June 2007 along with the LGV Est, a TGV high-speed rail line from Paris to Strasbourg. It is located in Les Trois-Domaines, about 30 km from Verdun and Bar-le-Duc, France. Designed by Jean-Marie Duthilleul, director of architecture for the  SNCF, it is the first timber-built station in France since Abbeville in 1856.

On 14 November 2015, a test train performing commissioning tests on the second phase of the LGV Est left Meuse TGV station headed to Strasbourg, but it derailed at a bridge over the Marne–Rhine Canal resulting in 11 deaths.

References

External links

 

Meuse TGV
Buildings and structures in Meuse (department)
Meuse